Eupithecia camilla is a moth in the family Geometridae. It is found in central China (Shaanxi).

The wingspan is about 19–20 mm. The forewings are brownish and the hindwings are pale grey.

References

Moths described in 2004
camilla
Moths of Asia